Margaretha Albertina Maria "Marga" Klompé (16 August 1912 – 28 October 1986) was a Dutch politician of the defunct Catholic People's Party (KVP) now merged into the Christian Democratic Appeal (CDA) party and chemist. She was granted the honorary title of Minister of State on 17 July 1971.

Klompé was known for her abilities as a manager and policy wonk. Recognized as one of the main architects of the post-war Dutch welfare state, Klompé was granted the honorary title of Minister of State on 17 July 1971 and continued to comment on political affairs as a stateswoman until her death at the age of 74 and holds the distinction as the first woman government minister in the Netherlands, the first woman awarded the honorary title of Minister of State, and the fifth longest-serving government minister after World War II with a total tenure of 11 years, 145 days.

Early life 
Margaretha Albertina Maria Klompé was born on 16 August 1912 in Arnhem in the Netherlands into a Catholic family of five children. Her father was the Dutch J. P. M. Klompé, who owned a stationery shop and her mother was the German-born A. M. J. A. Verdang.

Klompé attended a Gymnasium in Arnhem from June 1925 until June 1929 and applied at the Utrecht University in June 1929 majoring in Chemistry and obtaining a Bachelor of Science in Chemistry degree in April 1931 before graduating with a Master of Science in Chemistry degree in July 1932. During these years, and as a result of her studies, Klompé started to question several aspects of religion and in particular the institute itself. Following this crisis, Klompé's commitment to religion was reinforced which she combined with an open mind. Klompé lived outside the church for a number of years. But after finding her own orientation, more steeped in the mysticism of the Roman Catholic faith, she completely surrendered to it. She emerged from this personal crisis in a deep faithful way, but left it with a lasting respect for other forms of faith.

Klompé worked as a science teacher at the Mater Dei High School for girls in Nijmegen from July 1932 until August 1949. Klompé returned to the Utrecht University in June 1933 for a postgraduate education in Physics and Mathematics obtaining an Bachelor of Science degree in physics and an Bachelor of Mathematics degree in July 1934 before graduating with an Master of Physics degree and an Master of Mathematics degree in July 1936.

On 10 May 1940 Nazi Germany invaded the Netherlands and the government fled to London to escape the German occupation. During the German occupation Klompé continued her study and got an doctorate as an Doctor of Science in Mathematics on 21 April 1941 and as Doctor of Science in Physics on 30 April 1942. Klompé subsequently continued at the Utrecht University in June 1942 for another postgraduate education in Medicine but in April 1943 the German occupation authority closed the Utrecht University. Klompé joined the Dutch resistance against the German occupiers, as a messenger, soon after the invasion in May 1940.

Political career

After the war, Klompé started to focus on politics, which was rather unusual for a woman at the time. Klompé worked as a political activist for the Dutch People's Movement from May 1945 until August 1948. Klompé became a Member of the House of Representatives after Johan van Maarseveen was appointed as Minister of the Interior in the Cabinet Drees-Van Schaik after the election of 1948, taking office on 12 August 1948 serving as a frontbencher and spokesperson for Social Work, Welfare, Media and deputy spokesperson for Education and Culture. Klompé was selected as a Member of the European Coal and Steel Community Parliament and dual served in those positions, taking office on 10 September 1952. After the election of 1956 Klompé was appointed as Minister of Social Work in the Cabinet Drees III, taking office on 13 October 1956. The Cabinet Drees III fell on 11 December 1958 continued to serve in a demissionary capacity until the cabinet formation of 1958 when it was replaced by the caretaker Cabinet Beel II with Klompé continuing as Minister of Social Work, taking office on 22 December 1958.

After the election of 1959 Klompé returned as a Member of the House of Representatives, taking office on 20 March 1959. Following the cabinet formation of 1959 Klompé continued as Minister of Social Work in the Cabinet De Quay, taking office on 19 May 1959. Klompé served as acting Minister of Education, Arts and Sciences from 7 November 1961 until 4 February 1962 and again from 23 April 1963 until 24 July 1963 during two medical leave of absences of Jo Cals. Her main contribution was the passing of the Social Security Bill in 1963, which replaced the previous Poverty Bill.

After the election of 1963 Klompé again returned as a Member of the House of Representatives, taking office on 2 July 1963. Following the cabinet formation of 1963 Klompé per her own request asked not to be considered for a cabinet post in the new cabinet, the Cabinet De Quay was replaced by the Cabinet Marijnen on 24 July 1963 and she continued serving in the House of Representatives serving as a frontbencher chairing the parliamentary committee for Social Work and the special parliamentary committee for Parliamentary Procedures and spokesperson for Social Affairs, Education, Social Work, Welfare, Culture and Equality. On 14 October 1966 the incumbent Cabinet Cals fell and continued to serve in a demissionary capacity until the cabinet formation of 1966 when it was replaced by the caretaker Cabinet Zijlstra with Klompé again appointed as Minister of Culture, Recreation and Social Work, taking office on 22 November 1966.

After the election of 1967 Klompé once again returned as a Member of the House of Representatives, taking office 23 February 1967. Following the cabinet formation of 1967 Klompé remained as Minister of Culture, Recreation and Social Work in the Cabinet De Jong, taking office on 5 April 1967. In January 1971 Klompé announced her retirement from national politics and that she wouldn't stand for the election of 1971. The Cabinet De Jong was replaced by the Cabinet Biesheuvel I on 6 July 1971.

Later life
Klompé retired after spending 23 years in national politics and became active in the public sector and occupied numerous seats as a nonprofit director on several boards of directors and supervisory boards (Bible Society, Dutch Women's Council, Bernard van Leer Foundation, Society of Prosperity, Dutch Cancer Society, SNV Development Organisation, Open Doors Foundation and the Pontifical Council for Justice and Peace) and served on several state commissions and councils on behalf of the government (Council for Culture, Advisory Commission for Emancipation, Staatsbosbeheer and the Education Council) and as an advocate and activist for Poverty reduction, Basic income, Women's rights and European integration.

Klompé was also a member of several national and international associations, such as the Council of Europe and the Joint Task Force for European Cooperation in Development. In addition, Klompé was involved in the Catholic community. She was a member of the national council for the Bishops' Conference, member of the Papal Commission 'Justitia et Pax', and also founded the union of Roman Catholic female graduates. Furthermore, Klompé supported the underprivileged in society. Therefore, her critics called her 'Our Lady of Perpetual Succour'. Klompé died on 28 October 1986 in The Hague.

Decorations

References

External links

Official
  Dr. M.A.M. (Marga) Klompé Parlement & Politiek

 

 

 

 

1912 births
1986 deaths
Dutch anti-poverty advocates
Universal basic income activists
Catholic People's Party MEPs
Catholic People's Party politicians
Dutch expatriates in Italy
Dutch nonprofit directors
Dutch nonprofit executives
Dutch people of German descent
Dutch resistance members
Dutch Roman Catholics
Dutch women activists
Dutch women chemists
Dutch women mathematicians
Dutch women physicists
Dutch women's rights activists
European integration pioneers
Female resistance members of World War II
Grand Crosses of the Order of the Crown (Belgium)
Knights Grand Cross of the Order of Orange-Nassau
Knights of the Holy Sepulchre
Knights of the Order of the Netherlands Lion
Members of the House of Representatives (Netherlands)
Ministers of Education of the Netherlands
Ministers of Social Work of the Netherlands
Ministers of Sport of the Netherlands
Ministers of State (Netherlands)
People from Arnhem
Women government ministers of the Netherlands
20th-century women MEPs for the Netherlands
20th-century Dutch educators
20th-century Dutch mathematicians
20th-century Dutch scientists
20th-century Dutch politicians